Oscar Provencal is a Ghanaian actor, director, philanthropist and producer .

Provencal is best known for his role as Inspector Bediako in the TV series Inspector Bediako.

Career
In the early 1990s, Provencal played Inspector Bediako.  He also contested for the position of Deputy of Creative Arts Minister, was the judge for Ghana Most Beautiful Beauty Pageant He is also known for his philanthropy.

Filmography
 Deadly Voyage
 Inspector Bediako
 Bigman Wahala
 The Other Side of the Rich
Sin City

References

Ghanaian male film actors
Living people
Ghanaian film directors
Year of birth missing (living people)